SM U-117 was a Type UE II long-range minelayer submarine of the Imperial German Navy. She was laid down in 1917, at Hamburg, Germany, by Aktiengesellschaft Vulcan and launched on 10 December 1917. She was commissioned in the Imperial German Navy on 28 March 1918, with Kapitänleutnant Otto Dröscher in command. After shakedown, U-117 was posted to the U-Kreuzer Verband (submarine cruiser unit) on 1 June 1918. Over the next five weeks, she completed fitting out at Kiel.

Service history

Operations off North America
On 11 July, U-117 departed Kiel and took the eastern route through the Baltic Sea around Denmark and out into the North Sea by way of the Skagerrak. After rounding the Shetland Islands, she set a course for the coast of North America to lay minefields off the coast of the United States and to conduct cruiser warfare. During the voyage across the Atlantic, heavy weather foiled her attempts to attack two lone steamers, two convoys, and a small cruiser.

U-117 reached the American coastal zone on 8 August 1918, and her fortunes improved soon thereafter. On 10 August, she encountered a fleet of fishing craft and went on a spree, sinking eight of the vessels with explosives and gunfire. On 12 August, she sighted the ballast-laden steamer Sommerstadt and, after observing that the Norwegian steamer was armed, made a submerged attack that sank her with a single torpedo. The following day, the U-boat made another submerged torpedo attack and hit the  American tanker Frederic R. Kellogg, bound from Tampico, Mexico, to Boston, Massachusetts, with 7,500 barrels of crude oil.

Later that same day, the minelayer submarine began the other half of her duty by laying mines near Barnegat Light. The effort subsequently bore fruit when the Mallory Line steamship San Saba struck a mine and sank on 4 October 1918 and the Cuban cargo ship Chaparra struck another mine and sank on 27 October. On 14 August, U-117 took a break from mining operations to resume cruiser warfare when she encountered the American schooner Dorothy B. Barrett. The U-boat brought her deck guns to bear on the sailing vessel and sank her. Shortly thereafter, however, the hunter became the hunted when an American seaplane forced the submarine to seek refuge beneath the surface. The aircraft and submarine chaser  subjected U-117 to a brief barrage of bombs, and SC-71 attacked the submarine with depth charges before losing track of her.

The next day, 15 August 1918, U-117 resumed her mine laying operations off Fenwick Island Light. That field later claimed two victims, one damaged and the other sunk. On 29 September 1918,  struck one of those mines and suffered extensive damage. The Naval Overseas Transportation Service cargo ship  entered the same field on 9 November, struck a mine, and sank. Later that day – still 14 August – the submarine moved farther south and, after laying a third minefield near Winter Quarter Shoals Lightship, halted an American sailing vessel, the  Madrugada, and sank her with gunfire. A patrolling American seaplane foiled a subsequent attempt by the U-boat that day to stop another sailing ship.

On 16 August 1918, U-117 resumed her mining operations, this time off Cape Hatteras, North Carolina, but the approach of the  British steamer Mirlo interrupted her labors. Approaching the target submerged, U-117 fired a single torpedo that sent the merchantman to the bottom. Following that attack, the submarine again began laying mines, sowing her fourth and final field. At that point, a severe shortage of fuel forced the U-boat to head for Germany.

Return journey
The return voyage proved to be both more eventful and more successful than the outward-bound cruise. On 17 August 1918, she stopped a Norwegian sailing ship, the  Nordhav, out of Buenos Aires, Argentina, bound for New York laden with linseed. U-117 sailors placed bombs on board the cargo carrier that sank the prize. Three days later, the U-boat engaged in an unsuccessful surface gun duel with an unidentified, strongly armed steamer. On 26 August, she stopped the  Rush and sank that American trawler with bombs placed on board. The next day, U-117 caught sight of the Norwegian freighter Bergsdalen, steaming in ballast from La Pallice, France, to Baltimore, Maryland, and sank her quarry with a single torpedo. Three days later, on 30 August, she encountered her final two victims, when she stopped the  British fishing trawlers Elsie Porter and Potentate and sank both with explosive charges.

After an unsuccessful attempt at a torpedo attack on a lone British steamer, War Ranee, on 5 September 1918, U-117 concentrated on making the final run-in toward the Skagerrak and safety. Her critical fuel shortage forced the submarine to make wireless contact with U-140 on 8 September, to set up a fuel replenishment rendezvous. The submarine pulled into her destination rather ignominiously on 22 September, having had to call upon a patrolling torpedo boat to tow her the last leg of her journey.

For the rest of the war, U-117 remained inactive. On 23 October 1918, she was reassigned to the U-Flotille, Hochseeflotte (1st Submarine Flotilla, High Seas Fleet); but remained in a shipyard for the duration.

Turned over to US Navy

The armistice of 11 November 1918, ended hostilities, and required Germany to turn over her submarines to the Allies. U-117 surrendered at Harwich, England, ten days later. Over the ensuing weeks, the United States Navy expressed an interest in acquiring several former German submarines to serve as exhibits during a Victory Bond campaign. U-117 became one of the six boats set aside for that purpose. In March 1919, her American crew took over the submarine and placed her in special commission, Lieutenant Commander Aquilla G. Dibrell in command.

This unlikely American task organization, dubbed the Ex-German Submarine Expeditionary Force, called at the Azores and Bermuda before reaching New York City on 27 April 1919, where the submarines were soon opened to the public. Tourists, photographers, reporters, Navy Department technicians, and civilian submarine manufacturers all flocked in to see the six war trophies. Then orders came for her to begin a series of port visits to sell Victory Bonds. U-117 drew one of the east coast itineraries during the course of which she stopped at Washington, D.C., and spent a significant period of time at the Washington Navy Yard there. At the conclusion of the bond drive late that summer, the U-boat was laid up at the Philadelphia Navy Yard along with U-140 and UB-148. There, she remained – partially dismantled – until taken out to sea in June 1921, to serve as a target for aerial bombing tests conducted by the Navy and Army.

Sinking

The bombs were dropped in two salvos, one of three bombs and one of nine bombs. Both salvos straddled and fell close to the target, all within  of it, all bombs functioned as designed. The submarine sank within seven minutes after the second salvo. The Board of Observers did not inspect her.

Summary of raiding history

References

Notes

Citations

Bibliography

External links

 

German Type UE II submarines
U-boats commissioned in 1918
World War I submarines of Germany
U-boats sunk in 1921
1917 ships
U-boats sunk by US aircraft
Ships sunk as targets
Maritime incidents in 1921